Aung Lwin (born 23 October 1935) is a Myanmar Academy Award winning Burmese actor and director, having made his film debut in 1957.

Early life and career
Aung Lwin was born on Sittwe, Rakhine State,  Myanmar. His parents are ethnic Rakhine U Aung Kyaw Zan and Daw Kywe. He also studied at No.3, Basic Education High School, Botahtaung for about five years. He made his film debut in 1957 and starred in the 2004 film Naug Ma Kja Kyay. He also directed the Myanmar film Moe Goke Set Wyne Ko Kyaw Lun Yeuh (Beyond the Horizon). He is the board member of Myanmar Academy Awards selection committee of the Myanmar Motion Picture Organisation. He resigned from the Myanmar Academy Awards selection committee in July 2014. When he acts as a director, he uses the name "San Shwe Maung". Nowaday, He is the manager of the archive, spearheading the movement to preserve these important artefacts. He is usually star with another Rakhine actor Nay Toe in some of his films.

Filmography
Tein Hlwar Moht Moht Lwin (1967)
Kyaukme A Kyin Thar (1969)
Hmone Shwe Yee (1970)
Moe Nya Einmet Myu (2009)
A Tway (1962)
 Naw Kue Ma (1974)
 Beyond the Horizon (director)
 Nay Kyauk Khae (1983)
 Nauk Ma Kya Kyay
 Hatred in The Wind (2010)
 Pin Lay Yay Kan Nwe Mar Kan (2010)
 A Mhway Sein (2011)
 A Mhone Lwan Thaw (2011)
 Ko Lu Pyo Gee & Juliet (2011)
 Country's famous actress husband (2012)
 Tha Ye Tacay Shi Lar (2013)
 Wife's Relative (2014) 
 Pan Pyu Sa Tay Nya (2014)
 Online Ghost (2015) 
 Kingdom of Mrauk U Opera (2016) 
 Mhway Chet Chet Tay Myer Nay Tay (2018)
 Nhay Par Thwar Update (2019) 
 Problem (2019)
Longing with Love (2020)

References

Burmese male film actors
1935 births
Living people
People from Rakhine State
Burmese film directors
20th-century Burmese male actors
21st-century Burmese male actors
Burmese people of Rakhine descent